The Ras Al Khaimah Classic was a professional golf tournament that was held at Al Hamra Golf Club, in Ras Al Khaimah, United Arab Emirates. The tournament was intended to be a one-off event and was created in January 2022 as a replacement event on the schedule as the Commercial Bank Qatar Masters was postponed. The event was played the week after the inaugural Ras Al Khaimah Championship.

Ryan Fox won the event, cruising to a five-shot victory over Ross Fisher.

Winners

References

External links
Coverage on European Tour official site

Former European Tour events
Golf tournaments in the United Arab Emirates
Sports competitions in Dubai